Taejang was a Korean ceremony, where parents buried their baby's placenta or Tae in a special place on a special day. Tae means umbilical cord. Jang is a ceremony in which something is buried.

The origins of Taejan 
Korean ancestors considered Tae as the root of life, and took it in custody. It originated from Dogyo and Pungsujiriseol (a theory of location based on topography) which emphasize the importance of life above all else.

Koreans didn't throw away Tae, because it was the symbol of precious life. Instead, they buried it on a holy area. Koreans believed there lived a kind of qi in natural things, such as trees, water and mountains. The first record of Taejang is Kim Yushin's Taejang in Samguk Sagi. In 595, the wife of Manogun-governor Kim Soehyeon reportedly gave birth to a son after 20 months' pregnancy. The son was Kim Yushin, who became a famous general. Yushin's mother buried the Tae at the foot of Mt. Taeryeng. Goryeo Dynasty and Joseon Dynasty also kept the Taejang culture. In the Joseon Dynasty, the royal family attached great importance to Tae.

The geographical features of Taejang
Tae signified baby's life and destiny. In order to wish babies good luck, Korean ancestors kept Tae in a special place, and buried it in a holy place. The place was chosen, according to Pungsujiriseol. The best place for Tae was semisphere-formed land, which was located higher than the surroundings, but must not be linked with any high top of a mountain. If Tae was buried in such a holy place, the baby was believed to live a healthy and long life, succeeding later. People strongly had a belief that if Tae was buried in good earth, the baby of Tae would have a lot of good energies from the earth.

The royal family put Tae in a ceramic ware, and then installed it in a holy place. Areas or villages which had a holy place for Tae were called Taesil, Taebong and Taejang. There are now more than 20 areas which have the names of Taesil, Taebong and Taejang in South Korea. For example, in the Gyeonggi province: Yeoncheongun Jungmyeon Taebong-burag, Pocheongun Yeongjungmyeon Taebong-burag, Gapyeonggun Namsanmyeon Yangtaebong-burag and Gapyeonggun Sangmyeon Taebong-burag are areas that have common geographical features.

The ceremonies of Taejang
When delivering a baby, people didn't use an iron-knife to cut off Tae. They believed an iron-knife could cause some infection. Usually, they used a bamboo-knife instead.
 
After that, Korean ancestors washed Tae, and kept it in pottery. The quality and the form of the pottery were different according to the degree of their social status. The common people used a clay-pot, and the royal family used a special ceramic ware. The royal family had a special ceremony at the moment, when Tae was about to be placed in the ceramic ware, when it was to be buried in the earth.

During the Joseon Dynasty, there were special places called Taeshil or Taebong. The special stone monuments called Taebi were also erected there. Taebi consists of dragon-shaped headstones and turtle-shaped pedestals. The purpose of these things were to wish healthy and long lives, and a wise ruling to the king. In 1439, King Sejong appointed Jigwans who were in charge of finding holy places for Taeshil. Thus, King Sejong kept all his sons' Tae in Seongju.

References

Korean culture